Stillwater Lake is a residential community of the Halifax Regional Municipality in the Canadian province of Nova Scotia. As of the Canada 2021 Census, Stillwater Lake has a population of 3,379,  decrease of 2.0% from five years prior.

References
Explore HRM
Stillwater Lake on Destination Nova Scotia

Communities in Halifax, Nova Scotia
General Service Areas in Nova Scotia